Yury Komarov may refer to:

 Yury Komarov (businessman) (born 1945), Russian businessman
 Yury Komarov (footballer) (born 1954), Russian footballer